The ABC of Love is a 1916 German silent comedy film directed by Magnus Stifter and starring Asta Nielsen.

Cast
 Asta Nielsen as Lis
 Ludwig Trautmann as Philip von Dobbern
 Magnus Stifter as Graf von Kiesel

References

Bibliography

External links

1916 films
Films of the German Empire
Films directed by Magnus Stifter
German silent feature films
German black-and-white films
1916 comedy films
German comedy films
Silent comedy films
1910s German films
1910s German-language films